The Georgia Rampage were a professional indoor football team based in Dalton, Georgia. They were members of X-League Indoor Football (X-League). The Rampage joined the X-League in 2014, after a few members of the Ultimate Indoor Football League (UIFL) had planned on making a new league. The Rampage originally began play in 2012 as an expansion team of the UIFL, going by the name of the Rome Rampage. The Rampage played their home games at the Northwest Georgia Trade and Convention Center in Dalton.

Franchise history
The team was initially named the Rome River Dogs, but licensing issues forced the name change (which licensing issues are unknown, however, as the team would have been the first indoor/arena team named the River Dogs, while most notably the Arena Football League had the Grand Rapids Rampage.)

The Rampage was originally based in Rome, Georgia and became Rome's second indoor football team; their first since the Rome Renegades which played in the National Indoor Football League for 2005 and later the American Indoor Football League for 2006 (In both leagues, they went to the championship game, losing both times). The Rampage is Dalton's first indoor football team.

The Rampage is owned by Amer W. Awad and Kacee Smith (who also owns the North Georgia Bulldogs semi-pro team).

2012

On June 7, 2011, Joe Micco was named the first head coach in Rampage history. The Rampage were originally owned by Cecil Van Dyke with Kacee Smith as the general manager. However, a few weeks before the start of the season, Van Dyke was arrested for theft by taking putting the Rampage's season in doubt. After the arrest, Smith did all he could to save the season but was unable to find the funding to do so on a full scale, instead making the team a travel team in order to keep the Rampage name alive. While doing his personal taxes, Smith ran into Amer W. Awad who at the time was the office manager for Liberty Tax Service in Calhoun, Georgia. Awad inquired about potentially becoming a business partner stating he had always wanted to own a football team. After months of dialogue and attending the April 15, 2012 game versus the Eastern Kentucky Drillers, Awad and Smith came to an agreement and became business partners moving the team to Dalton. The partnership will officially begin with the 2013 season.

2013

With the new ownership of Kacee Smith and Amer Awad, the Rampage moved to Dalton, Georgia, where they changed their name to the Georgia Rampage. During an October press conference, the team announced that Mark Bramblett as the franchise's second ever head coach.

2014
For the 2014 season, the Rampage was a charter member of the X-League Indoor Football.

Logos

Roster

Season-by-season results

References

External links
Georgia Rampage official website

American football teams in Georgia (U.S. state)
Former Ultimate Indoor Football League teams
X-League Indoor Football teams
Dalton, Georgia
American football teams established in 2013
American football teams disestablished in 2015
2013 establishments in Georgia (U.S. state)
2015 disestablishments in Georgia (U.S. state)